The City of Armidale was a local government area in the New England region of New South Wales, Australia, encompassing the regional city of Armidale from 1863 to 2000.

It was proclaimed as the Municipality of Armidale on 13 November 1863 by Governor Sir John Young. The first aldermen were elected at a public meeting in the Armidale courthouse in December 1863, and the first mayor elected in January 1864. The number of aldermen was increased from six to nine in September 1868.

It became the City of Armidale when it was deemed to be a city in March 1885. The boundaries of the city were expanded in 1960 to include areas formerly part of the surrounding Dumaresq Shire.

The City of Armidale was amalgamated with Dumaresq Shire to form Armidale Dumaresq Council on 21 February 2000.

Mayors of Armidale

The mayors of the municipality were:

References

Former local government areas of New South Wales
1906 establishments in Australia
2000 disestablishments in Australia